Agi Band Bast (also Romanized as Āgī Band Bast; also known as Band Bast) is a village in Piveshk Rural District, Lirdaf District, Jask County, Hormozgan Province, Iran. At the 2006 census, its population was 102, in 27 families.

References 

Populated places in Jask County